Pelecanus halieus is a small fossil pelican described by Alexander Wetmore from material found in Late Pliocene deposits at Hagerman, Idaho.

References

Pelecanus
Pliocene birds
Fossil taxa described in 1933
Pliocene birds of North America
Taxa named by Alexander Wetmore